James Chalmers Burns (29 March 1809–30 November 1892) was a Scottish minister, who served as Moderator of the General Assembly for the Free Church of Scotland 1879/80.

Early life and education

He was born on 29 March 1809 in the manse at Brechin the second son of the Rev. James Burns (1774-1837) and his wife Christina Chalmers (1774-1837). His father was minister of the Cathedral Church there.  He had three uncles well-known to the Scottish Church, one of whom was a founder of the Presbyterian Church of Canada. They were the Rev. William Burns, D.D.,  minister of the parish of Duns before the  Disruption, and of the Free Church at Kilsyth; the Rev. Robert Burns, before  1843 a minister at Paisley, and later a prominent leader of the Presbyterian Church in Canada, and  Professor in one of its colleges; and the Rev. George Burns, minister of the parish of Tweedsmuir, and of the Free Church at Costorphine. On his mother's side Burns was also descended from a clerical family — the Chalmers' of  Aberdeen. His grandfather, James Chalmers, a  printer, was founder of The Aberdeen Journal.

He studied Divinity at Glasgow University. His first employment was as assistant to Rev Dr James Buchanan at North Leith Church on Madeira Street in Edinburgh.

Early ministry
He was ordained into the Church of Scotland at the Scots Church at London Wall in 1837.

In the Disruption of 1843 he left the established church and joined the Free Church, being given an immediate position at Kirkliston. The church, originally built as a simple box chapel, was one of the first built for the Free Church and was opened by Rev Thomas Chalmers himself.

Oversees work
In supplying the summer stations at Lausanne,  Cannes, and Aix-les-Bains,  Burns became acquainted with Continental life, and widened his theological outlook. For a long period he filled the office of Convener of the Colonial Committee of his Church. In the winter of 1849-50 he spent six months in Canada. For some weeks he supplied the pulpit of Chalmers' Church, Quebec, with so much acceptance that  he was urgently requestcd to remain as permanent minister. Then he went to Montreal, where he  preached for five months in the Colte Church. There also he proved popular and was cordially invited to undertake the pastoral charge of the congregation. Once more, in 1874, he crossed the Atlantic in company with the  James Hood Wilson, Barclay Church, Edinburgh. They went as a deputation to the Presbyterian Assembly of  America,  which  met  that  year  at St. Louis. Thereafter  they  passed on to Halifax, where the Synod of the Canadian Church was gathered. Some idea of their work may be gathered from the fact that during their short visit they had to preach thirty sermons and give one hundred and twelve addresses.

Wider church work
In 1879 he was elected Moderator of the General Assembly, succeeding Rev Andrew Bonar. He was succeeded as Moderator in 1880 by Rev Thomas Main.

Dr. Burns was connected with the British Society for the Propagation of the Gospel Among the Jews from its beginning. 
He was present at the meeting held in the National Scotch Church, Regent Square, London, on November 7, 1842, at which the British Society was formed.

A spire was added to his church in 1880 greatly improving the appearance, to a design by Edinburgh architect, Hippolyte Blanc.

He retired as minister of Kirkliston in 1890 being replaced by Rev Robert Alexander Lendrum.

He died on 30 November 1892 and is buried in Kirkliston churchyard.

Kirkliston Free Church is now the Thomas Chalmers Centre.

Works
Christian and  Ecclesiastical  Unity  (London,  1841)
Memorial  of  James  Maitland  Hog  of Newliston  (Edinburgh,  1858)
How  the  Spirit of  God  may  be  Quenched  (Edinburgh,  1859)
Addresses  in  General  Assembly  (Edinburgh, 1879)
"London  Reminiscences  1843" (Brown's  Annals  of  the  Disruption,  529-43) (Edinburgh,  1892)
edited  Select  Remains of  Professor  Islay  Burns,  D.D.  (London, 1874).

Artistic recognition

He was portrayed by William Hole RSA in 1887.

Family
He  married  1838,  Anne  (born 1815, died  17 October 1884),  daughter  of  Thomas  Robertson,  Commander Royal Navy,  and  Susan  Barr, and  had issue — 
Susan  Robertson,  born  7  August 1839,  died  at  Edinburgh  24  August  1914
Christina  Chalmers,  born  1843  (married  her cousin,  James  Guthrie  of  Pitforthie,  banker, Brechin,  son  of  Thomas Guthrie),  died 14  December  1923
Anne  Jemima  Guthrie,  born 19  June  1845  (married  her  cousin,  Charles John Guthrie,  K.C.,  LL.D.,  Senator  of  the College  of  Justice  [Lord  Guthrie],  also  son  of Thomas  Guthrie,  D.D.),  died  28  May  1927
Alice  Mary,  born  1850,  died  at  Edinburgh 25  February  1927
James  Thomas,  born  14 March  1852,  died  30  July  1881
William Charles  Mansfield,  born  11  July  1860,  died 7  June  1864.

References
Citations

Sources

External links
 

1809 births
1892 deaths
People from Brechin
Alumni of the University of Glasgow
19th-century Ministers of the Church of Scotland